De Stentor is a Zwolle-based Dutch regional newspaper, appearing in several editions, in the Eastern part of the Netherlands. It is owned by De Persgroep.

The Stentor has 10 regional editions:
 West-Veluwe
 Deventer
 Salland
 Zutphen & Achterhoek
 Zwolle
 Vechtdal
 Kampen-Flevoland
 Veluwe
 Kop van Overijssel

Distribution 
Annual paid distribution was:
 2003: 158,987
 2010: 121,551
 2011: 116,043 (-4.5%)
 2012: 111,596 (-3.8%)
 2013: 104,687 (-6.2%)
 2014: 99,375 (-5.1%)
 2015: 93,065 (-6.3%)
 2016: 90,313 (-3.0%)
 2017: 87,510 (-3.1%)

External links
 

Daily newspapers published in the Netherlands
Mass media in Flevoland
Mass media in Gelderland
Mass media in Overijssel